Jeff Ellington was a member of the Indiana House of Representatives, representing the 62nd district. A member of the Republican Party, he was appointed to the State House by a Republican caucus in December 2015 after the seat was vacated by incumbent Matt Ubelhor. He previously served on the Monroe County Council from 1997 to 2005 and was the Monroe County Recorder from 2014 to 2015. He lost reelection as Recorder in 2014. He ran for Indiana's 9th congressional district in 2002, but lost the Republican primary to Mike Sodrel. He ran for the State House in 1998 for the 60th district, but lost the general election to Peggy Welch. He attended Indiana University Bloomington from 1980 to 1982. After redistricting in Indiana, Ellington announced that he would be running for the 45th district in the Indiana House of Representatives in 2022. He lost the Republican primary to Bruce Borders in May 2022.

References

External links

Official House Website

Living people
Republican Party members of the Indiana House of Representatives
21st-century American politicians
People from Monroe County, Indiana
Politicians from Bloomington, Indiana
Year of birth missing (living people)